Ravulizumab, sold under the brand name Ultomiris, is a humanized monoclonal antibody complement inhibitor medication designed for the treatment of paroxysmal nocturnal hemoglobinuria (PNH) and atypical hemolytic uremic syndrome. It is designed to bind to and prevent the activation of Complement component 5 (C5).

Paroxysmal nocturnal hemoglobinuria is characterized by red blood cell destruction, anemia (red blood cells unable to carry enough oxygen to tissues), blood clots, and impaired bone marrow function (not making enough blood cells). In paroxysmal nocturnal hemoglobinuria, proteins known as the 'complement system', which is part of the immune system, become overactive because of a genetic mutation and start to attack the patients' own red blood cells. Ravulizumab, is a monoclonal antibody (a type of protein) designed to attach to the C5 protein, which is part of the complement system. By attaching to the C5 protein, the medicine blocks its effect and thereby reduces the destruction of red blood cells.

The most common side effects are upper respiratory tract infection (nose and throat infection), nasopharyngitis (inflammation of the nose and throat) and headache. The most serious side effect is meningococcal infection, a bacterial infection caused by Neisseria meningitidis that can cause meningitis and sepsis.

Medical uses 
In the United States, ravulizumab is indicated for the treatment of adults and children one month of age and older with paroxysmal nocturnal hemoglobinuria and for the treatment of adults and children one month of age and older with atypical hemolytic uremic syndrome (aHUS) to inhibit complement-mediated thrombotic microangiopathy (TMA).

In the European Union, ravulizumab is indicated in the treatment of adults with paroxysmal nocturnal haemoglobinuria:
 in people with haemolysis with clinical symptom(s) indicative of high disease activity
 in people who are clinically stable after having been treated with eculizumab for at least the past six months.

Names 
Ravulizumab is the International Nonproprietary Name (INN).

History 
Ravulizumab was developed by Alexion Pharmaceuticals, Inc. It was engineered from eculizumab to have a longer-lasting effect.

Ravulizumab was approved by the US Food and Drug Administration (FDA) in December 2018. In April 2019, the Committee for Medicinal Products for Human Use (CHMP) of the European Medicines Agency (EMA) recommended the granting of a conditional marketing authorization for ravulizumab. Ravulizumab was approved for medical use in the EU in July 2019.

References

Further reading

External links
 

AstraZeneca brands
Monoclonal antibodies
Orphan drugs